The land area of Victoria, Australia is estimated to have had 88% forest coverage totaling 199,830 km2 in 1869 during early European colonisation of Victoria. This was at a time between the 1861 and 1871 censuses of the colony of Victoria in which the number of inhabitants of the colony were estimated to number between 540,322 (1861) and 729,654 (1871), and the number of houses were estimated to number between 134,332 (1861) and 160,410 (1871). By 1987, deforestation had led to the forested areas of Victoria declining to 35% (79,656 km2) of the total land area.

Protection of forests 
By 2016, the state of Victoria had formally protected 31,382 km2 of forested land area, equating to 14% of the land area of Victoria. A further 7,397 km2 of forested land area had been informally protected by 2016, equating to an additional 3% of the land area of Victoria.

In November 2017, the Victoria State Government led by Australian Labor Party (Victorian Branch) released a plan setting a target date of 2037 by which Victoria should start to experience a net gain in the extent and quality of native vegetation within Victoria. The plan noted that although deforestation had slowed since regulations were introduced in 1989, net deforestation of 40 km2 per year was still being experienced within Victoria.

In November 2019, the Victoria State Government led by Australian Labor Party (Victorian Branch) announced that deforestation of native forests on crown lands would be phased out by 2030. This would have the effect of plantation timber being the only timber being sourced from the land area of Victoria from 2030. Both the Liberal Party of Australia (Victorian Division) and National Party of Australia – Victoria opposed the plan to phase out deforestation of native forests by 2030, claiming the practice is sustainable. The Australian Greens Victoria campaigned for an immediate end to deforestation of native forests within Victoria.

See also 

 Land clearing in Australia

Notes

References 

Land management in Australia
Environmental issues in Australia